Doorie is the second album by Atif Aslam. Lyrics were written by Sameer Anjaan, Sayeed Qaudri, Atif Aslam, Sachin Gupta, Uzma and Shahzad while composed by Atif Aslam, Sachin Gupta and Mithoon Sharma.

Performance
Doorie was a global success & hit. The singles topped the Indian as well as the Pakistani charts. Doorie remained top on charts for several weeks after its release.
It was the first International album by Atif Aslam. It was more successful in India than Pakistan,Nepal and Bangladesh. Doorie was released simultaneously in India and Pakistan on 22 December 2006.

Track listing

Awards

References

External links
Atif Aslam Doorie is a Popular Song
Atif Aslam Doorie Review
Doorie By Atif Aslam
Atif Aslam Official Website

2006 albums
Atif Aslam albums
Urdu-language albums